OMNIS (Office des Mines Nationales et des Industries Stratégiques, formerly known as Office Militaire National pour les Industries Stratégiques) is the Malagasy government organisation, operating under the auspices of the Ministry of Energy, responsible for:

Hydrocarbons:
– Putting in place and updating the legal framework for upstream oil and gas activities in Madagascar
– Acquisition of technical exploration data (geological, geophysical and drilling)
– Promotion of potentially hydrocarbon-bearing areas
– Management of existing and newly acquired exploration data
– Laboratory analysis of samples (rock, oil and gas)

Mining:
– Promotion of the Malagasy mining sector
– Development of basic sectoral infrastructure relevant to various minerals
– Undertaking of minerals research including energy minerals (radioactive minerals, fossil fuels, etc.)
– Development of and feasibility studies for mining projects, minerals production, etc.
– Assistance and support to national and international mining sector companies
– Promotion of partnership contracts

The acting Director General of OMNIS is Mr. Joeli Valerien Lalaharisaina, who was formerly its Deputy Director General.

References

 https://web.archive.org/web/20070614182924/http://www.energy.gov.mg/
 Google Earth Map of Petroleum Licenses in Madagascar

Energy in Madagascar
Energy organizations